Dyer Island is a small island between Lee Island and Entrance Island in Holme Bay, Mac. Robertson Land. Plotted from photos taken by ANARE (Australian National Antarctic Research Expeditions) aircraft in 1956. Named by Antarctic Names Committee of Australia (ANCA) after R. Dyer, cook at nearby Mawson station in 1960.

See also 
 List of antarctic and sub-antarctic islands

Islands of Antarctica